Ella Melanie Rutherford  (born 28 April 2000) is an English footballer who plays as a striker for Charlton Athletic Women in the FA Women's Championship.

Club career

Millwall Lionesses
Rutherford spent most of her youth career at Millwall's Centre of Excellence, playing for Millwall's youth teams. Rutherford made her senior debut the week of her 16th birthday playing for Millwall Lionesses during the 2017 FA WSL 2 Spring Series. She finished the Spring Series as joint top scorer for the Lionesses with three goals in six appearances and was named the club's Young Player of the Year.  During the following 2017–18 season she was named an FA WSL 2 Breakout Star.

Bristol City
In July 2018, Rutherford left Millwall alongside a raft of other players as the club faced financial difficulties. After a trial with Arsenal, Rutherford signed with Bristol City. Ahead of the 2019–20 season, Rutherford went on loan to FA Women's Championship team Crystal Palace. On 6 January 2020, Rutherford joined FA Women's Championship team Leicester City on loan until the end of the season.

International career
Rutherford has represented England at the under-15, under-16, under-17 and under-19 levels.

References

External links
 Ella Rutherford on Twitter
 Ella Rutherford on UEFA.com

2000 births
Living people
Women's Super League players
Women's association football midfielders
English women's footballers
Millwall Lionesses L.F.C. players
Bristol City W.F.C. players
Leicester City W.F.C. players
Charlton Athletic W.F.C. players
Women's Championship (England) players